This is a list of Papua New Guinea national rugby league team players. 310 players have represented Papua New Guinea Kumuls since 1975 starring with Kumul # 1 Paul Chue and the latest being Jeremiah Simbiken in 2022 who is PNG Kumul  #310.

Kumuls register

References

External links
 

 
Papua New Guinea